The 2015 IBSF World Snooker Championship was an amateur snooker tournament which took place from 9 November to 21 November 2015 in Hurghada, Egypt.

It will be the 41st edition of the IBSF World Snooker Championship and also doubles as a qualification event for the World Snooker Tour.

The men's tournament was won by Pankaj Advani of India who won his second IBSF World Snooker Championship, defeating 2013 runner-up Zhao Xintong 8–6 in the final.

Wendy Jans won the women's tournament by defeating Anastasia Nechaeva 5–1 in the final. This victory was Jans fourth consecutive tournament win and her fifth overall.

Tournament 
The tournament was an event run by the International Billiards and Snooker Federation (IBSF). The event was originally due to take place in Sharm el-Sheikh, however due to the Metrojet Flight 9268 crash the tournament was relocated to Hurghada. Because of this many competitors withdrew from the competition amid safety fears and this ended up leaving some of the groups featuring as little as four players who would subsequently all qualify for the knockout stage of the tournament regardless of their results in the group stage. The men's event also doubled as a qualification event for the World Snooker Tour.

Singles players 
2015 IBSF World Snooker Championship – Men's

2015 IBSF World Snooker Championship – Women's

Seedings

Men's event

Women's event

References

2015 in snooker
Snooker amateur tournaments
Hurghada
2015 in Egyptian sport
International sports competitions hosted by Egypt
November 2015 sports events in Africa